Paul Joseph Perry Loscocco (born March 7, 1962) is an American lawyer and politician. He is a former Massachusetts Republican state representative and candidate for lieutenant governor in the 2010 Massachusetts gubernatorial election.

In January 2010, Loscocco announced his intention to unenroll from the Republican Party in order to run for lieutenant governor as an independent in the 2010 Massachusetts gubernatorial election. State Treasurer and former Democrat Tim Cahill had selected Loscocco to be his running mate. After months of campaigning, on October 1, 2010, Loscocco withdrew from the race and endorsed Republican candidate Charlie Baker.

Early life and career
He is the son of Anthony P. Loscocco and R. Marie (nee Perry) Loscocco. He graduated from Holliston High School in 1980, and then attended Boston College, where he earned his B.A. in 1984. He then enrolled in Boston College Law School where he earned his J.D. in 1987 and has practiced law as an attorney for the Boston-based law firm of Riemer & Braunstein since graduating.

Political career
He ran for the Massachusetts House of Representatives in 2000 and won his first bid for elected office. Loscocco served the 8th Middlesex District from 2001 until 2009. He did not run for re-election in the 2008 elections.

2010 campaign for lieutenant governor
He was running for lieutenant governor as an independent with State Treasurer Tim Cahill, a former Democrat. On October 1, 2010, Loscocco left the Cahill campaign and endorsed Republican Charles Baker, citing Cahill's falling poll numbers.

Personal life
Loscocco and his wife Ann are the parents of three children. They live in Chatham, New Hampshire.

References

People from Holliston, Massachusetts
People from Framingham, Massachusetts
Living people
Boston College alumni
Boston College Law School alumni
Members of the Massachusetts House of Representatives
Candidates in the 2010 United States elections
21st-century American politicians
Massachusetts Republicans
21st-century American lawyers
20th-century American lawyers
Massachusetts Independents
1962 births
American people of Italian descent